This is list of breweries in North Dakota.

Breweries in North Dakota

 Dakota Beer 
 Dakota Malting and Brewing Company 
 Edwinton Brewing 
 Fargo Beer Co.
 Fargo Brewing Company 
 Laughing Sun Brewing 
 Phat Fish Brewing 
 Williston Brewing Company

Wineries in North Dakota
 Fluffy Fields Vineyard and Winery
 Pointe of View Winery

See also 
 Beer in the United States
 List of breweries in the United States
 List of microbreweries
 North Dakota wine

References

Further reading
 ND bill would allow brew pubs to distribute beer - Businessweek

Companies based in North Dakota
North Dakota
Breweries
Lists of vineyards and wineries